Active Component may refer to:

 Active duty, a full-time occupation as part of a military force, as opposed to reserve duty
 "Active Components", now "Active Tech", an industrial electronics retail part vendor formerly part of Future Electronics
 In electronics, active components are devices (such as valves or transistors) with the ability to amplify a signal or produce a power gain